Luca "ROX" Rossetti (born 24 March 1976) is an Italian rally driver. He won the Italian Rally Championship in 2008, the European Rally Championship in 2008, 2010 and 2011, and the Turkish Rally Championship in 2012 driving a Skoda Fabia S2000 for Pegasus Racing. Luca Rossetti's co-driver is Italian Matteo Chiarcossi.

IRC results

References

External links 
 Official website
 ROX Fan Club Valtellina

1976 births
Living people
Italian rally drivers
European Rally Championship drivers
People from Pordenone